Ashok K. Mishra is the Kemper and Ethel Marley Foundation Chair, Morrison School of Agribusiness in the WP Carey School of Business, at the Arizona State University. He conducts research and teaching activities in agribusiness, food security, public policy, finance. He is currently serving as Editor of Journal of Agribusiness in Developing and Emerging Economies (JADEE), and the Co-Editor of Agricultural Economics: An International Journal;

Career 
Mishra's research interests lie in food policy and focuses on the economic performance of global agribusiness as a result of production efficiency, mergers and acquisitions, and volatile commodity prices. He has also studied the impact farmland valuation, agricultural land values, and farm profitability have on the cost of producing and marketing food.

Mishra has also held positions at the U.S. Department of Agriculture, Economic Research Service and Louisiana State University.  His research and teaching activities center around food security, agribusiness finance and management, and labor and household economics.

References

External links
 
 
 

Year of birth missing (living people)
Living people
21st-century American economists
North Carolina State University alumni
Arizona State University faculty
United States Department of Agriculture people
Louisiana State University people